The 2008 FIFA Club World Cup (officially known as the FIFA Club World Cup Japan 2008 presented by Toyota for sponsorship reasons) was the fifth FIFA Club World Cup, a football tournament for the champion clubs from each of FIFA's six continental confederations. The tournament was held in Japan from 11 to 21 December 2008.

Defending champions Milan did not qualify, having been eliminated in the round of 16 of the 2007–08 UEFA Champions League. The winners of that competition, Manchester United, won the Club World Cup for the first time, beating Gamba Osaka 5–3 in the semi-finals before a 1–0 win over LDU Quito in the final at the International Stadium in Yokohama on 21 December. It was United's second world title, following the 1999 Intercontinental Cup, which was also held in Japan.

The fifth-place match, dropped for the 2007 tournament, was reintroduced for 2008, with the total prize money being increased by US$500,000 to US$16.5 million. The winners took away US$5 million, the losing finalists US$4 million, the third-placed team US$2.5 million, the fourth-placed team US$2 million, the fifth-placed team US$1.5 million, the sixth-placed team US$1 million and the seventh-placed team US$500,000.

Host bids
On 13 August 2007, the Organising Committee for the FIFA Club World Cup recommended to the FIFA Executive Committee that Japan should host the 2008 tournament. This was approved by the executive committee on 29 October 2007 during their meeting in Zürich, Switzerland.

Qualified teams

Notes

Venues
Tokyo, Yokohama and Toyota were the three cities to serve as venues for the 2008 FIFA Club World Cup.

Match officials

Squads

Matches

All times are Japan Standard Time (UTC+9)

Play-off for quarter-finals

Quarter-finals

Semi-finals

Match for fifth place

Match for third place

Final

Goalscorers

1 own goal
 Fausto Pinto (Pachuca, against Al Ahly)

Awards

References

External links

FIFA Club World Cup Japan 2008, FIFA.com
2008 FIFA Club World Cup Official Site (Archived)
FIFA Technical Report

 
2008
Sports competitions in Tokyo
Sports competitions in Yokohama
2008 in association football
2008–09 in English football
2008–09 in Mexican football
2008–09 in Egyptian football
2008 in Japanese football
2008 in Ecuadorian football
2008 in Australian soccer
2008–09 in New Zealand association football
2008